Elm Street Historic District may refer to:

 Elm Street Historic District (Hartford, Connecticut)
 Elm Street Historic District (Hatfield, Massachusetts)
 Elm Street Historic District (New Haven, Connecticut), a state and/or local historic district in New Haven, Connecticut
 Elm Street Historic District (Northampton, Massachusetts), a local historic district in the city of Northampton, Massachusetts
 Elm Street Historic District (Rocky Hill, Connecticut), listed on the National Register of Historic Places in Hartford County, Connecticut
 Elm Street Historic District (Worcester, Massachusetts)

See also
 Elm Street (disambiguation)